Nebaioth ( Nəḇāyōṯ) or Nebajoth is mentioned at least five times in the Hebrew Bible, according to which he was the firstborn son of Ishmael, and the name appears as the name of one of the wilderness tribes mentioned in the Book of Genesis 25:13, and in the Book of Isaiah 60:7.

Biblical occurrences
In the Book of Genesis, Nebaioth is listed as the firstborn son of Ishmael:
...Now these are the generations of Ishmael, Abraham's son, whom Hagar the Egyptian, Sarah's handmaid, bore unto Abraham. And these are the names of the sons of Ishmael, by their names, according to their generations: the first-born of Ishmael, Nebaioth; and Kedar, and Adbeel, and Mibsam, and Mishma, and Dumah, and Massa; Hadad, and Tema, Jetur, Naphish, and Kedem; these are the sons of Ishmael, and these are their names, by their villages, and by their encampments; twelve princes according to their nations... (Book of Genesis 25:12-16)

Nebaioth is portrayed as the brother of Mahalath, one of Esau's wives:
(1): ...and Esau saw that the daughters of Canaan pleased not Isaac his father; so Esau went unto Ishmael, and took unto the wives that he had Mahalath the daughter of Ishmael, Abraham's son, the sister of Nebaioth, to be his wife... (Book of Genesis 28:8-9)

(2): ...Esau took his wives of the daughters of Canaan; Adah the daughter of Elon the Hittite, and Oholibamah the daughter of Anah, the daughter of Zibeon the Hivite, and Basemath Ishmael's daughter, sister of Nebaioth... (Book of Genesis 36:2-3)

Nebaioth is again mentioned as Ishmael's firstborn in the genealogies of the First Book of Chronicles:

...These are their generations: the first-born of Ishmael, Nebaioth; then Kedar, and Adbeel, and Mibsam, Mishma, and Dumah, Massa, Hadad, and Tema, Jetur, Naphish, and Kedem. These are the sons of Ishmael... (1 Chronicles 1:29-31)

In the Book of Isaiah, Nebaioth is mentioned along with his brother Kedar:
 
... All the flocks of Kedar shall be gathered together unto you, the rams of Nebaioth shall minister unto you; they shall come up with acceptance on my altar, and I will glorify my glorious house... (Book of Isaiah 60:7)

Extra-biblical occurrences
Based on similarity of sounds, Josephus, the Jewish historian of the Roman era, suggested that there was a connection with the historical Nabataeans of Hellenistic and Roman times  (Jewish Antiquities 1.12.4). Although Jerome followed him, modern historians reject any connection of the Nabataeans to the "tribe of Nebaioth". Classical Arab historians sometimes name Nebaioth as an ancestor of Muhammad. However the majority of traditions point to Kedar, another son of Ishmael, as his ancestor.

References

Book of Genesis people
Arab culture
Arab history
Family of Muhammad
Year of birth unknown
Place of birth unknown
Year of death unknown
Ishmaelites